The Rio Bonito is a small river in the Sierra Blanca mountains of southern New Mexico, United States. The headwaters of the river start in the Lincoln National Forest on the slopes of Sierra Blanca and travel eastward until they merge with the south fork of the Rio Bonito just west of Bonito Lake, a man-made reservoir. After passing through the reservoir, the river continues in a generally eastward direction passing through the historic Fort Stanton and the home of Billy the Kid, Lincoln, New Mexico.  past Lincoln the Rio Bonito merges with the Rio Ruidoso in the town of Hondo, New Mexico where the two rivers join to form the Rio Hondo which then flows towards the Pecos River. Though not reaching the Pecos except during floods.

Several fish species live within the waters of the Rio Ruidoso, including:
 Several species of trout
 Rio Grande Sucker
 Rio Grande Chub
 Longnose Dace
 fathead minnow

See also
 Lincoln National Forest
 List of New Mexico rivers
 Mescalero Apache Indian Reservation
 Ruidoso, New Mexico
 Sacramento Mountains
 Sierra Blanca

Notes and references

 

Rivers of New Mexico
Rivers of Lincoln County, New Mexico